The 22941/22942 Indore - Jammu Tawi Weekly Superfast Express is a superfast train of the Indian Railways which runs between Indore Junction of Madhya Pradesh and Jammu Tawi the Winter capital city of Jammu and Kashmir. The train is the second train between Indore and Jammu after Malwa Express.

Coach Composition

The train consists of 22 coaches :

 1 AC II Tier
 3 AC III Tier
 12 Sleepar Class
 4 General Unreserved
 2 Seating cum Luggage Rake

Service

The 22941/Indore - Jammu Tawi Weekly Superfast Express has an average speed of 55 km/hr and covers 1411 km in 25 hrs 30 mins.

The 22942/Jammu Tawi - Indore Weekly Superfast Express has an average speed of 58 km/hr and covers 1411 km in 24 hrs 15 mins.

Route and halts 

The important halts of the train are :

Schedule

Reversals

The train reverses its direction at:

Traction

Both trains are hauled by a Vadodara Loco Shed based WAP 5 or WAP 4E electric locomotives.

See also

 Indore-Chandigarh Weekly Express
 Indore-Dehradun Express
 Indore - Amritsar Express
 Malwa Express

References 

Express trains in India
Rail transport in Uttar Pradesh
Rail transport in Haryana
Rail transport in Rajasthan
Rail transport in Delhi
Rail transport in Punjab, India
Rail transport in Jammu and Kashmir
Railway services introduced in 2014
Transport in Indore
Transport in Jammu